Steve Wallace may refer to:
Steve Wallace (racing driver) (born 1987), stock car driver
Steve Wallace (American football) (born 1964), former NFL football player
Stephen Wallace (born 1943), Australian film director
Stephen Wallace (public servant), Canadian civil servant

See also 
Stephen Wallis (born 1964), Australian rules footballer